Roving Mars is a 2006 American IMAX documentary film about the development, launch, and operation of the Mars Exploration Rovers, Spirit and Opportunity. The film uses few actual photographs from Mars, opting to use computer generated animation based on the photographs and data from the rovers and other Mars probes. The film has been released on Blu-ray disc by distributor Disney.

Roving Mars has made over US$10 million as of January 25, 2009.

Roving Mars is also the title of a non-fiction book by MER principal investigator Steve Squyres about the rover mission.

Music
The musical score for Roving Mars was composed by Philip Glass. A soundtrack album was released by Lakeshore Records on June 27, 2006. The album also features the song "Glósóli" by Sigur Rós.

Reception
Roving Mars received positive reviews from critics. Rotten Tomatoes reports a 70% rating based on 37 reviews, with an average rating of 6.8/10. Its consensus states that "Roving Mars is a decent thrill ride even when it starts feeling like a commercial plug for NASA's failing space program."

Entertainment Weekly gave the film a B−, stating that "Only a series of pics featuring a set of strange little nodes that look like blueberries planted in a pile of red rocks carry any kind of translatable otherworldly kick." The New York Post called it a "splendidly photographed 2D IMAX film." The Boston Globe said "Despite audiences knowing the happy ending from the get-go, [director] [George] Butler manages to inject considerable drama."

Conversely, the Los Angeles Times claimed, "Not having a way to capture images of the machines at work means that too much of Butler's film... is disappointingly made up of computer simulations.", while the San Francisco Chronicle claimed that "There aren't enough pyrotechnics in the paltry 40-minute run time to justify the ticket price."

References

External links
 
 
 
 Boston Globe article about the development of the film

2006 films
2006 short documentary films
American short documentary films
Disney documentary films
Documentary films about the space program of the United States
Films scored by Philip Glass
Films produced by Frank Marshall
IMAX short films
Mars Exploration Rover mission
Mars in film
The Kennedy/Marshall Company films
Walt Disney Pictures films
Disney short films
IMAX documentary films
Documentary films about outer space
Films directed by George Butler (filmmaker)
2000s English-language films
2000s American films